Metalink was an Israeli-based hi-tech company specializing in silicon solutions for wireless and wireline broadband communications. Metalink offered integrated circuits and board level solutions targeting residential gateways, access points, routers, PC cards, set-top boxes (STB), digital media adapters (DMA) and wireless HDTVs. The products complied with IEEE 802.11n standard defining WLAN using Multiple-input multiple-output communications (MIMO). Other product lines included SDSL and VDSL products for triple-play services.

The company was headquartered in Yakum, Israel, with design centers in the USA, Ukraine, and Taiwan.

Networking companies
Semiconductor companies of Israel
Fabless semiconductor companies
Electronics companies established in 1992
Companies formerly listed on the Nasdaq
Companies traded over-the-counter in the United States